Amelanchier intermedia, also known as intermediate serviceberry, shadbush or juneberry, is a wetland shrub, thought to be a hybrid of A. canadensis and A. laevis.

It is distinguished from A. canadensis by its sparser pubescence, and from A. laevis by the weaker red colouration.

References

intermedia